Amanda Haydee Mondol Cuellar (born January 10, 1965 in Bogotá) is a Colombian sport shooter. She earned a silver medal in the air pistol at the 2003 Pan American Games in Santo Domingo, Dominican Republic, and was selected to compete for Colombia, as the oldest female athlete (aged 39), at the 2004 Summer Olympics. Mondol is also a full-time member of Target Shooting Club in her native Bogotá, under her personal coach Luis Boduero.

Mondol qualified for the Colombian squad in pistol shooting at the 2004 Summer Olympics in Athens, by having attained a mandatory Olympic standard of 373 and claiming the silver medal in the air pistol from the 2003 Pan American Games in Santo Domingo, Dominican Republic. Mondol started off her Olympic run by firing 368 points to finish in a thirty-fifth place tie with three other shooters in the 10 m air pistol prelims. On her second event, 25 m pistol, Mondol registered 293 points in three precision series and 284 in the rapid fire stage to accumulate an overall record of 577 and improve her feat with a thirteenth-place effort, narrowly missing out the final round by a three-point shortfall.

References

External links
ISSF Profile

1965 births
Living people
Colombian female sport shooters
Olympic shooters of Colombia
Shooters at the 2004 Summer Olympics
Shooters at the 2003 Pan American Games
Pan American Games silver medalists for Colombia
Sportspeople from Bogotá
Pan American Games medalists in shooting
Shooters at the 2015 Pan American Games
South American Games bronze medalists for Colombia
South American Games medalists in shooting
Competitors at the 2018 South American Games
Medalists at the 2003 Pan American Games
20th-century Colombian women
21st-century Colombian women